Parliamentary elections were held in Serbia on 26 September 1889. The result was a victory for the People's Radical Party, which won 102 of the 117 seats in the National Assembly.

Background
The elections were originally planned for November, but was later rescheduled for September. After King Milan abdicated in February 1889, it was thought that fresh elections would be held shortly afterwards, but it was decided by the regents later in March that there would be no early election on the basis that Crown Prince Alexander was a minor and could not be required to take the Constitutional Oath before the National Assembly, and as the Regents had taken their oath in the presence of King Milan, the National Assembly was not required. This was in violation of the constitution, which required the regents to immediately call an election.

The Progressive Party chose not to contest the election.

Results

Aftermath
The newly elected Assembly met for the first time on 13 October.

References

Parliamentary
Elections in Serbia
Serbia
Serbia